St Peter's GAA is a Gaelic Athletic Association club in Warrenpoint, County Down, Northern Ireland.

Foundation

The GAA in Warrenpoint pre-dates St Peter's by a considerable span of years for it was in 1888 that the original seed was sown with the name of John Martin. The club colours were black and amber strips.

Being adopted on a proposal by John Carr and seconded by Thomas Caulifield the Club maintained the name until the mid-1920s until it fell on hard times. In 1931, it revived but because Glenn had registered a new club, John Martin some months before, the name of St Peter's was chosen and blue and white were chosen as the club colours.

It is worth noting that the John Martin's of 1888 won the first competition held in Down by beating Mayobridge at Edenmore. The Warrenpoint flute band paraded the victors through Mayobridge village on the occasion.

There are no records of John Martin's winning many more competitions but once St Peter's found their feet they went on to win the Junior Championship in 1932 when they beat Saul in the final.

For many years the club played at Connolly's field at Moygannon and then at a variety of venues before settling in its current habitat at Moygannon which was purchased in 1972 for £10,000. Dressing rooms and showers were added in the 1980s at a cost of £45,000.

The first phase of a major redevelopment of Moygannon Park has recently been completed incorporating the construction of a new playing pitch surface under the guidance of Club Trustee Gerry Gray. The cost of this development was £130,000. A new electronic scoreboard has also been erected.

In the 1960s some derelict houses at Mary Street, Warrenpoint were purchased for £50. These were converted into small clubrooms using the voluntary labour of members and friends. The clubrooms were used for meetings, functions and fundraising. There were two rooms (upstairs and downstairs) each approximately 18 ft x 25 ft. The cost of rebuilding was £2,000 approximately.

An extension was added to the clubrooms in the 1970s giving a ground floor hall of 54 ft x 26 ft with a balcony 18 ft x 25 ft. Later a small kitchen was added. The total cost of this contract was £5,000.

Two dwellings were purchased either side of the clubrooms in Mary Street in the 1980s to facilitate future development of the clubrooms including an upstairs social club and bar. The total cost of this development was £46,000. The second house is still occupied by a tenant and rent is paid to St Peter's GAC.

In the 1970s an activity room 40 ft x 20 ft was also purchased for £10,000 and located at the back of the Clubrooms. This room provided for supervised youth activity seven nights a week for 15 years. This property is no longer utilised. There is also a fully licensed bar on the premises.

The 'golden era' for the Point was in the 1940s and 1950s when they won three senior titles and contributed to a few memorable finals in which they were the losers.

The senior team is currently playing in Down Division 2.

Club teams fielded
The club currently organises the following sides:

 Football (8 Teams) – U8, U10, U12, U14, U16, Minor, Premier Reserve and Senior (Div 1).
 Hurling (7 Teams) – U10, U12, U14, U16, Minor, Reserve(Div 2) and Senior (Div 1).
 Camogie (2 Teams) – U12, U14

Playing achievements

Football
 Down Senior Football Championship: 1943, 1948, 1953
 Down Junior Football Championship: 1932, 1940
 Down Minor Football Championship: 1950, 1977, 2012
 Down Under-16 All County Football Championship: 1986, 2016
 Down Underage Football Championship: 1995, 1997
 Down Reserve Football Championship: 1996, 2012
 Down Intermediate Football Championship: 2001, 2012, 2014
 Underage South Down League Championship: 2006, 2014
 Down Senior Division 2 Championship: 2008
 Down Under-21 Football Championship: 2013, 2014

Hurling
 Ulster Senior Hurling League Championship (Div 5): 2008
 Down Junior Hurling Championship 2009, 2022

Hurling

The panel entered into the Ulster league for a second year running after reaching the quarter finals stages of section-3 last season. The Ulster League campaign allowed the senior team finish in mid-table.

In 2019, the club won Division 2 and earned promotion to Division 1. After narrowly losing out in the 2020 championship final (played in 2021 due to the COVID-19 pandemic), the team won their second ever Junior hurling championship title defeating Castlewellan on a scoreline of 1-15 to 1-14 in Newry.

Culture
The club has been at the forefront of the revival of Irish Set Dancing and for over 20 years has organised annual set dancing competitions and workshops. In 1993, St Peter's Set Dancers (along with a company of musicians and singers) travelled to Normandy to participate in the annual Normandy Cultural Festival.

Since Warrenpoint hosted its first Ceili in 1917, the club has been active in the GAA Scor, cultural competitions and has been successful at All-Ireland level in both Scor and Scor na nÓg competitions. In 1978, the Junior team won the All-Ireland Scor na nÓg Ceili Dancing Title. Warrenpoint won the All-Ireland Scor Set Dancing Title in 1982 and after many years of winning County and Ulster titles the club won the Scor All-Ireland quiz title in 1996.

Irish language classes are organised for adults and juniors on a regular basis and the Club has also been involved in drama over the years.

In addition, two members of the club, Sighle Nic An Ultaigh and Belle O'Loughlin, have held the position of President of the Camogie Association of Ireland. Sighle also held the post of General Secretary of the Camogie Association for 25 years, and is the author of the Down GAA history, "O Shiol go Blath".

The club's brass band section, St Peter's Band, has won a number of All-Ireland Awards and has joined with the Warrenpoint silver band on several occasions.

See also
Down Senior Club Football Championship
List of Gaelic Athletic Association clubs
An Riocht
Bredagh GAC
Castlewellan GAC
Clonduff GAC
Kilcoo GAC
Longstone GAC
John Mitchel GFC
Newry Bosco GFC

External links
St Peter's GAA, Warrenpoint/Cumann Peadar Naomha CLG, Rinn Mhic Giolla Rua official club website
Sighle Nic An Ultaigh's "O Shiol go Blath"
Official An Riocht GAA Club website
Official Down County website

Gaelic games clubs in County Down
Gaelic football clubs in County Down
Hurling clubs in County Down
Warrenpoint